Richard Wheler (died 1614) was the member of the Parliament of England for Great Bedwyn for 1584 and 1586 and for Marlborough for the parliaments of 1589, 1593, and 1597.

References 

Members of Parliament for Marlborough
1614 deaths
Year of birth unknown
Members of Parliament for Great Bedwyn
English lawyers
English MPs 1584–1585
English MPs 1586–1587
English MPs 1589
English MPs 1593
English MPs 1597–1598